Zire (Sîshëë), also known as Nerë, is an extinct Oceanic language of New Caledonia. It has been extinct since April 2006. Zire is sometimes considered a dialect of Ajië.

References

New Caledonian languages
Languages of New Caledonia
Extinct languages of Oceania